The Association Nationale des Scouts de Guinée, the national Scouting association of Guinea, became a member of the World Organization of the Scout Movement first in 1990 and again in 2005, after a break in membership. Scouting was officially founded in 1984. The association has 10,592 members (as of 2008).

The Association Nationale des Scouts de Guinée consists of several sub-associations, among them the Association des Scouts Catholiques de Guinée (Catholic Scout Association of Guinea).

The Scout Motto is Sois Prêt (Be Prepared) in French.

See also
Association Nationale des Guides de Guinée

References

External links
 Association des Scouts Catholiques de Guinée

World Organization of the Scout Movement member organizations
Scouting and Guiding in Guinea
Youth organizations established in 1984